The Umělecká beseda was a Czech artists' forum, bringing together creative artists in literature, music and fine art. First founded in 1863, it formed an important part of Czech cultural life in the late 19th and early 20th centuries. Under Communism in the early 1950s it fell from favour, and it was closed in 1972. It was refounded in 1990, though without the return of previously-confiscated property. The Na Prádle Theater now occupies the building that the association had purpose-built in 1925.

Founding members

Bedřich Smetana – composer
Josef Manes – painter
Eduard Herold – painter and writer
Mikoláš Aleš – painter
Jan Evangelista Purkyně – scientist and artist
Karel Jaromír Erben – poet and folklorist
Vítězslav Hálek – poet
Karel Purkyně – painter
Josef Bohuslav Foerster – composer
Other members have included the painter and printmaker Jana Budíková.

Sources

Literature 
 V umění volnost (Kapitoly z dějin Umělecké besedy), 2003, Matys Rudolf, 356 s., Academia, Praha,  
 Umělecká beseda 1863–2003, 2003, Petrová Eva, 163 s., GHMP, Praha, 
 Padesát let Umělecké besedy 1863–1913, 1913, 320 s., vyd. Umělecká beseda, Praha, Besední 3
 Lexikon malířství a grafiky,

External links
 Oficiální stránky Umělecké besedy
 Informační systém abART: Umělecká beseda
 ČRO Vltava ke 150. výročí založení UB
 Výstava Krajské galerie výtvarného umění ve Zlíně ke 150. výročí založení UB
 Členská výstava Most 2007
 UB roku 2003 (140. výročí založení)
 UB roku 2003, Český rozhlas
 Britské listy 6.2.2004

Society of the Czech Republic
Organizations established in 1863
1863 establishments in Europe
Organizations disestablished in 1972
1972 disestablishments in Czechoslovakia
Arts organizations established in 1990
1990 establishments in Czechoslovakia